Sophie Boilley (born 18 December 1989) is a retired French biathlete and soldier.

Boilley was born in Valence, Drôme. She competed at the Biathlon World Championships 2011, and won a silver medal in the relay with the French team.

Results

World Championships
2 medals (2 silver)

World Cup
Relay victories
2 victories

References

External links

1989 births
Living people
French female biathletes
Sportspeople from Valence, Drôme
Biathlon World Championships medalists
21st-century French women